Philothamnus girardi is a species of snake in the family Colubridae. The species was described and named by José Vicente Barbosa du Bocage in 1893. The specific name, girardi, is in honor of French-Portuguese zoologist Alberto Arthur Alexandre Girard (1860-1914).

Geographic range
P. girardi occurs on the island of Annobón in Equatorial Guinea. The species may also occur in the Republic of the Congo.

References

Further reading
Boulenger GA (1894). Catalogue of the Snakes in the British Museum (Natural History). Volume II., Containing the Conclusion of the Colubridæ Aglyphæ. London: Trustees of the British Museum (Natural History). (Taylor and Francis, printers), p. 102).

Colubrids
Reptiles described in 1893
Taxa named by José Vicente Barbosa du Bocage
Fauna of Annobón
Reptiles of Equatorial Guinea